Kilgetty is a village immediately north of Saundersfoot in Pembrokeshire, Wales, at the junction of the A477 between St. Clears and Pembroke Dock and the A478 between Tenby and Cardigan.

Community
The villages of Kilgetty, Reynalton and Begelly make up the community of Kilgetty/Begelly. In 2011 it had a population of 1,207.

History
Kilgetty, in Narberth Hundred and the parish of St Issel's, was the name of an ancient mansion owned by the Picton family and was already decaying in the 19th century, according to Lewis's Topographical Dictionary of Wales published in 1833. It was subsequently. demolished. The remnants of the garden are designated Grade II on the Cadw/ICOMOS Register of Parks and Gardens of Special Historic Interest in Wales.

Coal mining
The last Pembrokeshire coal mine, at Kilgetty, closed in 1950.

Amenities
The village has local shopping facilities, a pub, which was called the Railway Inn, now the White Horse, and a sports club that has a cricket ground. There is a local scout group known as 1st Kilgetty. St Mary's Mission Church in the village closed for worship in the 1990s and is now a private residence. Kilgetty railway station is a request stop on the West Wales Line.

References

External links 

Photos of Kilgetty and surrounding area on geograph.org.uk

Villages in Pembrokeshire
Registered historic parks and gardens in Pembrokeshire